Area 11 is an English rock band from Nottingham, England. The band consists of four members: Thomas "Sparkles*" Clarke, Alex Parvis, Jonathan Kogan and Leo Taylor. To date, they have released a number of singles, three EPs, and two studio albums.

The band's sound is heavy with minimal synthesizers and electronic effects that they call modern rock, however in their earlier records, Area 11's sound commonly blended heavy metal guitar riffs with a wider more prominent range of synthesizers and electronic effects, which they sometimes referred to as gaijin rock.

Biography
Area 11 consists of Tom Clarke, Alex Parvis, Jonathan Kogan, and Leo Taylor. They formed on 8 October 2010 in Nottingham during what was described by band frontman Sparkles* as a "disastrous jam session". Founding members Sparkles*, Luke, and Alex then discovered their shared love of anime whilst watching Code Geass episode 22 "Blood Stained Euphy", from which they wrote their first song, Euphemia.

The name "Area 11" is a reference to the anime Code Geass, as Japan is referred to as Area 11 in the series, with its citizens referred to as Elevens, a name which has come to collectively describe Area 11 fans. In fact, some of Area 11's songs are based on various anime, including Code Geass, Death Note, Tengen Toppa Gurren Lagann, Naruto, Elfen Lied, Bakuman, Fullmetal Alchemist due to the band's strong fondness of the genre at the time of recording their earlier records. Towards the end of recording their debut album, All the Lights in the Sky, the band decided that they had done all they wanted in terms of writing songs about anime, and stopped writing songs about the animation genre, wanting to explore original new ideas and concepts.

The band has been commissioned to produce music for companies such as YouTube broadcasting group The Yogscast and Namco Bandai Games. Significantly for Namco Bandai Games they produced "GO!! Fighting Action Power" as the credits theme for their Bravoman web-series on ShiftyLook, and later "Wonder Wars" as the theme song for the Wonder Momo anime series.

Area 11's music has already permeated alternative and popular culture, which is reflected their chart success and loyal fan-base of over 100,000 worldwide. They have toured the UK on multiple occasions to capacity audiences.

Musical style
The band's sound consists mostly of heavy guitars (including 7-stringed guitars) but also makes subtle use of synthesizers, orchestral sections and electronic effects. In contrast to this many songs contain acoustic instruments such as acoustic guitars and emotional piano melodies.

In their earlier records, Area 11's sound commonly blended rock and metal styles of guitar with aspects of Japanese music including J-pop, this sound they referred to by the tongue-in-cheek name, gaijin rock as "gaijin" in Japanese means "foreigner", "a fusion of pop-punk, metal, prog, and glam fortified by a major obsession with anime, video games, and Japanese comics."

Discography

Studio albums

Live albums

Extended plays

Singles

Members

Current members

Tom 'Sparkles*' Clarke – lead vocals, keys (2010–present)
Alex 'Parv' Parvis – guitar, backing vocals (2010–present)
Jonathan 'Kogie' Kogan – bass, saxophone, backing vocals (2011–present)
Leo Taylor – drums, percussion, backing vocals (2010–present)

Past members
Luke Owens – guitar, backing vocals (2010–2012)
Tim Yearsley – bass (2010–2011)

Timeline

References

English rock music groups
Musical groups established in 2010
2010 establishments in England